Nuwan Gunawardana (13 May 1949 – 8 December 2022), was a Sri Lankan musician, singer and composer.

Personal and Professional Life
Gunawardana was born in Sri Lanka (then known as Ceylon) on 13 May 1949. He worked as an aircraft mechanical engineer for Air Ceylon and started singing as a hobby during work. Sound engineer Mervyn Baines discovered his talent and directed him to film background vocals. He rose to fame in the 1980s and 1990s by singing popular Hindi songs. He then became a famous concert singer in Sri Lanka. He was married to Ramona Gunawardena, with whom he had two children, Dulariya, a businesswoman, and Gayan, an actor and singer.

Death
Gunawardana passed away at the age of 73 from a heart attack on 8 December 2022. He was undergoing treatment at the Sri Jayawardenepura General Hospital at the time of his death.

References

1949 births
2022 deaths
20th-century Sri Lankan male singers
Sri Lankan composers
Sinhalese singers